El Sicario, Room 164 is a 2010 documentary film directed by Gianfranco Rosi and based on an article by Charles Bowden.

Synopsis
The film's subject is an anonymous Ciudad Juárez sicario known to have killed hundreds. An expert in torture and kidnapping, he was employed by Mexican drug cartels and the Chihuahua State Police simultaneously.  In the film, he recounts his story to the camera inside the very hotel room he once used to hold and torture kidnapped victims, his face concealed by a black mesh hood. Using a marker and notepad, he illustrates his career of crime, murder, abduction, and torture.
There exists a $250,000 bounty on his life.

Reception
El Sicario, Room 164 has a score of 76 out of 100 on Metacritic and a 92% rating on Rotten Tomatoes.

References

External links
 

2010 films
Films about Mexican drug cartels
Films directed by Gianfranco Rosi
2010 documentary films
Documentary films about the illegal drug trade
Documentary films about criminals
Ciudad Juárez
Documentary films about Mexico
2010s Mexican films